Mayflower was the ship that transported the Pilgrims from Plymouth to the New World in 1620.

Mayflower may also refer to:

Literature
Mayflower (series), an unfinished book trilogy by Orson Scott Card and Kathryn H. Kidd
 Mayflower: A Story of Courage, Community, and War, a 2006 book by Nathaniel Philbrick

Places
Mayflower, Arkansas
Mayflower Village, California
Mayflower, Missouri
Mayflower, Virginia

Plants
 Cardamine pratensis, mayflower or cuckoo-flower
 Epigaea repens, mayflower or trailing arbutus
 Maianthemum canadense, Canada mayflower or false lily-of-the-valley
 Crataegus, hawthorn, quickthorn, thornapple, May-tree, whitethorn, or hawberry
 Crataegus monogyna, the common hawthorn or may
 Laelia speciosa, Mayflower orchid
 Cattleya trianae, Flor de Mayo ('May flower') or Christmas orchid

Rail transportation
 Mayflower (passenger train), an English train service from Kingswear to London Paddington
 LNER Thompson Class B1 61306 or Mayflower, a preserved steam locomotive
 Mayflower line, a railway line from Manningtree to Harwich in Essex, England
 Mayflower MRT station, a station in Singapore

Schools
 Mayflower School, a school in Ikenne, Ogun State, Nigeria
 Mayflower Secondary School, a school in Ang Mo Kio, Singapore
 Mayflower High School, a school in Billericay, Essex, England
 Mayflower Primary School, Poplar, a school in London, England
 Mayflower School (Juneau, Alaska)
 Mayflower High School (Arkansas)
 Mayflower School District

Ships
 List of ships named Mayflower

Other uses
 Mayflower: The Pilgrims' Adventure, a 1979 American TV film 
 Triumph Mayflower, a British car
 Mayflower Hotel, a hotel in Washington, D.C.
 Mayflower Mall, a mall in Sydney, Nova Scotia, Canada
 Mayflower Productions, a former British-based film production company
 Mayflower Theatre, a theatre in Southampton, England
 Mayflower Transit, an American moving company

See also
 Sydney Biddle Barrows, an American businesswoman and escort agency owner, later known as the Mayflower Madam
 Majblomma ('Mayflower'), a traditional Swedish charity pin
 Mayflower Compact, the first governing document of Plymouth Colony
 Mayflower Compact signatories